Shirley Ann Jackson,  (born August 5, 1946) is an American physicist, and was the 18th president of Rensselaer Polytechnic Institute. She is the first African-American woman to have earned a doctorate at the Massachusetts Institute of Technology (MIT) in Theoretical Elementary Particle Physics, and the first African-American woman to have earned a doctorate at MIT in any field. She is also the second African-American woman in the United States to earn a doctorate in physics.

Biography
Jackson was born in Washington, D.C. and attended Roosevelt Senior High School. After graduation in 1964, she enrolled at MIT to study theoretical physics, earning her B.S. degree in 1968.

Jackson elected to stay at MIT for her doctoral work, and received her Ph.D. degree in nuclear physics in 1973, the first African-American woman to earn a doctorate degree from MIT. Her research was directed by James Young, a professor in the MIT Center for Theoretical Physics. Jackson is also the second African-American woman in the United States to earn a doctorate in physics. She was featured on the PBS show "Finding Your Roots" Season 6 Episode 7, where she is noted as one of the leading global pioneers in science all while knowing little about her ancestry. In 2002, Discover magazine recognized her as one of the 50 most important women in science.

Jackson has described her interests thus:

AT&T Bell Laboratories 
Jackson joined the Theoretical Physics Research Department at AT&T Bell Laboratories in 1976, examining the fundamental properties of various materials. She began her time at Bell Labs by studying materials to be used in the semiconductor industry. She worked in the Scattering and Low Energy Physics Research Department from 1978, and moved to the Solid State and Quantum Physics Research Department in 1988. At Bell Labs, Jackson researched the optical and electronic properties of two-dimensional and quasi-two-dimensional systems.

Jackson served on the faculty at Rutgers University in Piscataway and New Brunswick, New Jersey from 1991 to 1995, in addition to continuing to consult with Bell Labs on semiconductor theory. Her research during this time focused on the electronic and optical properties of two-dimensional systems.

Although some sources claim that Jackson conducted scientific research while working at Bell Laboratories that enabled others to invent the portable fax, touch-tone telephone, solar cells, fiber optic cables, and the technology behind caller ID and call waiting, Jackson herself makes no such claim. Moreover, these telecommunications advancements significantly predated her arrival at Bell Labs in 1976, with these six specifically enumerated inventions actually occurring by others in the time frame between 1954 and 1970.

U.S. Nuclear Regulatory Commission 
In 1995 she was appointed by President Bill Clinton to serve as Chairman of the US Nuclear Regulatory Commission (NRC), becoming the first woman and first African American to hold that position.  At the NRC, she had "ultimate authority for all NRC functions pertaining to an emergency involving an NRC licensee". In addition, while Jackson served on the commission she assisted in the establishment of the International Nuclear Regulators Association. Dr. Jackson served as the chairperson for the International Regulators Association from 1997 to 1999. The association consisted of senior nuclear regulatory officials from countries like Canada, France, Germany and Spain.

Rensselaer Polytechnic Institute 
On July 1, 1999, Jackson became the 18th president of Rensselaer Polytechnic Institute. She was the first woman and first African American to hold this position. Since her appointment to president of RPI, Jackson has helped raise over $1 billion in donations for philanthropic causes.

She led the development of a strategic initiative called The Rensselaer Plan and much progress has been made towards achieving the Plan's goals. She oversaw a large capital improvement campaign, including the construction of an Experimental Media and Performing Arts Center costing $200 million, and the East Campus Athletic Village.

On April 26, 2006, the faculty of RPI (including a number of ‘’emeritus’’ faculty) voted 155 to 149 against a vote of no-confidence in Jackson.

Since arriving at RPI, Jackson's salary and benefits have expanded from $423,150 in 1999–2000 to over $1.3 million in 2006–2007. In 2011 Jackson's salary was $1.75 million. In 2006–07, and it is estimated she received another $1.3 million from board seats at several major corporations. The announcement of layoffs at RPI in December 2008 led some in the RPI community to question whether the institute should continue to compensate Jackson at this level, maintain an Adirondack residence for her, and continue to support a personal staff.

On December 4–5, 2009 Jackson celebrated her tenth year at RPI with a "Celebration Weekend", which featured tribute concerts by Aretha Franklin and Joshua Bell among other events. Following the weekend, the Board of Trustees announced they would support construction of a new guest house on Jackson's property, for the purpose of "[enabling] the presidents to receive and entertain, appropriately, Rensselaer constituents, donors, and other high-level visitors".  The trustees said that "the funds for this new project would not have been available for any other purpose". William Walker, the school's Vice President of Strategic Communications and External Relations noted "The Board sees this very much as a long-term investment … for President Jackson and her successors".

The Zoning Board stated that it is "too big", and two firefighters believed the property would be difficult to access with emergency vehicles. A new plan was announced on February 25, describing how the president's house will be replaced with a new two-story house. The new house will have "9,600 square feet of livable space, divided approximately equally between living space for the president's family and rooms for the president to conduct meetings and events".

In June 2010, it was announced that the Rensselaer Board of Trustees unanimously voted to extend Jackson a ten-year contract renewal, which she accepted. Shirley Ann Jackson's compensation ranked first among US private university presidents in 2014.

A 2015 Money.com article cited Jackson as the highest-paid college President and "took home a base salary of $945,000 plus another $276,474 in bonuses, $31,874 in nontaxable benefits".

In fall of 2018, another contract extension was approved by the board of trustees through the end of June 2022.

On June 25, 2021, Jackson publicly announced she would be stepping down from her post as president as of July 1, 2022, after 23 years.

The Nature Conservancy 
In February 2020, Shirley Ann Jackson joined the Nature Conservancy Global Board. She will be serving on this board until October 2029. Board Chair Tom Tierney says, "To successfully take on the most pressing environmental challenges facing us, TNC needs people with ambition and big ideas".

Honors and distinctions
Jackson has received many fellowships, including the Martin Marietta Aircraft Company Scholarship and Fellowship, the Prince Hall Masons Scholarship, the National Science Foundation Traineeship, and a Ford Foundation Advanced Study Fellowship. She has been elected to numerous special societies, including the American Philosophical Society. In 2014, she was named a recipient of the National Medal of Science.

In the early 1990s, then-New Jersey Governor James Florio awarded Jackson the Thomas Alva Edison Science Award for her contributions to physics and for the promotion of science.

Jackson received awards for the years 1976 and 1981 as one of the Outstanding Young Women of America. She was inducted into National Women's Hall of Fame in 1998 for "her significant contributions as a distinguished scientist and advocate for education, science, and public policy". She received a Candace Award for Technology from the National Coalition of 100 Black Women in 1982.

In 2001, she received the Richtmyer Memorial Award given annually by the American Association of Physics Teachers.  She has also received many honorary doctorate degrees.

In spring 2007, she was awarded the Vannevar Bush Award for "a lifetime of achievements in scientific research, education and senior statesman-like contributions to public policy".

In 2007, she received the Golden Plate Award of the American Academy of Achievement presented by Awards Council member Dr. Ben Carson.

In 2008 she became the University Vice Chairman of the US Council on Competitiveness, a non-for profit group based in Washington, DC. In 2009, President Barack Obama appointed Jackson to serve on the President's Council of Advisors on Science and Technology, a 20-member advisory group dedicated to public policy.

She was appointed an International Fellow of the Royal Academy of Engineering (FREng) in 2012.

In 2018, she was awarded by the Hutchins Center for African American Research with the W.E.B DuBois medal. In 2019, the American Physical Society Forum on Physics and Society awarded her the Joseph A. Burton Forum Award.

In 2021, she was the recipient of the Hans Christian Oersted Medal from the American Association of Physics Teachers. Also in 2021, she received, from the UC Berkeley Academic Senate, the Clark Kerr Award for distinguished leadership in higher education.

Personal life
Shirley Jackson is married to Dr. Morris A. Washington, a physics professor at Rensselaer Polytechnic Institute, and they have one adult son. She is a member of Delta Sigma Theta sorority.

Philanthropy
Shirley Ann Jackson and her husband were named to the inaugural class of the Capital Region Philanthropy Hall of Fame in 2019.

See also
 Timeline of women in science

References

External links

Official Profile from Rensselaer Polytechnic Institute
Shirley Ann Jackson at IWasWondering.com

Article and profile from the Chronicle of Higher Education
Biography of Jackson from IEEE
Discussion with Charlie Rose

C-SPAN Q&A interview with Jackson, January 2, 2005

|-

|-

1946 births
20th-century American physicists
21st-century women engineers
Directors of IBM
Fellows of the American Association for the Advancement of Science
Fellows of the Royal Academy of Engineering
Female Fellows of the Royal Academy of Engineering
Living people
Members of the United States National Academy of Engineering
National Medal of Science laureates
Nuclear Regulatory Commission officials
Particle physicists
People associated with CERN
People associated with Fermilab
People from Troy, New York
Presidents of Rensselaer Polytechnic Institute
Rensselaer Polytechnic Institute faculty
2007
American women physicists
20th-century women engineers
Engineers from New York (state)
Women heads of universities and colleges
MIT Center for Theoretical Physics alumni
MIT Department of Physics alumni
Members of the National Society of Black Physicists
African-American women scientists
20th-century African-American women
20th-century African-American scientists
American women academics
21st-century African-American people
21st-century African-American women
20th-century American women scientists
Fellows of the American Physical Society